Churu Lok Sabha constituency is one of the 25 Lok Sabha (parliamentary)  constituencies in Rajasthan state in India.

Assembly segments
Presently, Churu Lok Sabha constituency comprises eight Vidhan Sabha (legislative assembly) segments. These are:

Members of Parliament

Election Results

See also
 Churu district
 List of Constituencies of the Lok Sabha

Notes

External links
Churu lok sabha  constituency election 2019 result details

Churu district
Lok Sabha constituencies in Rajasthan